Conoplea is a genus of fungi first described by Christian Hendrik Persoon in 1801. The eight members of the genus are anamorphic versions of Sarcosomataceae species.

References

External links
Conoplea at Index Fungorum

Pezizales
Pezizales genera